Charlie Mohr (died April 17, 1960) was a middleweight college boxer for the University of Wisconsin–Madison. Mohr, from New York City, died of a brain hemorrhage following an NCAA Tournament bout eight days earlier with Stu Bartell of San Jose State University. Twenty-two days after Mohr's death, the University of Wisconsin–Madison abolished the sport at UW–Madison. The NCAA soon followed Wisconsin's lead, officially ending their support of the national boxing tournament in late 1960 and unofficially terminating the sport.

References

Further reading

External links 
 https://web.archive.org/web/20061129000200/http://www.smithsonianmag.com/issues/2000/april/boxing.php .Copied at http://www.accessmylibrary.com/coms2/summary_0286-5742592_ITM (downloaded 20 October 2009).
 http://sportsillustrated.cnn.com/vault/article/magazine/MAG1071184/1/index.htm(downloaded 20 October 2009). 
 http://sportsillustrated.cnn.com/2010/writers/the_bonus/04/16/mohr/index.html?eref=si_latest 

Year of birth missing
1960 deaths
American male boxers
Boxers from New York City
Deaths due to injuries sustained in boxing
Middleweight boxers
Sports deaths in Wisconsin
Wisconsin Badgers boxers